Java Municipality (Javis municip’alit’et’i) is a municipality of Georgia, in the region of  Shida Kartli.

International status
The entire municipality is located in the partly recognized Republic of South Ossetia (Dzau District of South Ossetia) and has not been under control of Georgian government since 1992.

Transport
Roki Tunnel, a strategic pass linking South Ossetia with Russia, is located in the municipality.

See also 
 List of municipalities in Georgia (country)

Municipalities of Shida Kartli